Needlework Development Scheme (NDS) was a collaborative program between industry and art education, that was to encourage and initiate a new standard for British embroidery design in both hand and machine work. The organisation was primarily responsible for developing collections of foreign and British embroidery, that could be loaned to training colleges, Women's Institutes, and schools.

Started in 1934, the program was originally set up in Scotland by the four Scottish art schools, Aberdeen, Dundee, Edinburgh and Glasgow under the name Needlework Development in Scotland Scheme. The project was a collaborative initiated between industry and art education, that was to encourage British embroidery design. The project was sponsored anonymously by thread producers J & P Coats.

By 1945 the scheme had amassed over 900 embroideries but the outbreak of the Second World War saw the project disbanded. The Scheme was restated after the war, in 1944, and extended throughout the 1950s to include schools in England, Wales and Northern Ireland. British artists, including the painter and illustrator Mary Kessell were speciality commissioned to create experimental designs for the scheme which could then be reinterpreted in embroidery. The program ended in 1961, having achieved its original aims, and the collection of over 3,500 embroideries, was given to various museums and organisation, including the Victoria and Albert Museum in London and the National Museum of Scotland in Edinburgh.

References

Needlework
Visual arts education
Embroidery
1934 establishments in Scotland
1961 disestablishments
1934 in art
Collections of the National Museums of Scotland
Collections of the Victoria and Albert Museum
Edinburgh College of Art
Glasgow School of Art